Baldur Benedikt von Schirach (9 May 1907 – 8 August 1974) was a German politician who is best known for his role as the Nazi Party national youth leader and head of the Hitler Youth from 1931 to 1940. He later served as Gauleiter and Reichsstatthalter ("Reich Governor") of Vienna. After World War II, he was convicted of crimes against humanity during the Nuremberg trials and sentenced to 20 years in prison.

Early life

Schirach was born in Berlin, the youngest of four children of theatre director, grand ducal chamberlain and retired captain of the cavalry Carl Baily Norris von Schirach (1873–1948) and his American wife Emma Middleton Lynah Tillou (1872–1944). A member of the noble Schirach family, of Sorbian West Slavic origins, three of his four grandparents were from the United States, chiefly from Pennsylvania. English was the first language he learned at home and he did not learn to speak German until the age of five. He had two sisters, Viktoria and the opera singer Rosalind von Schirach, and a brother, Karl Benedict von Schirach. His brother committed suicide in 1919 at the age of 19. He was confirmed at church at age 14 although he grew away from the church in favor of the Nazi youth movement.

On 31 March 1932 Schirach married the 19-year-old Henriette Hoffmann, the daughter of Heinrich Hoffmann, Adolf Hitler's personal photographer and sometime friend. Schirach's family was vehemently opposed to this marriage, but Hitler insisted. Gregor Strasser dismissively described Schirach as "a young effeminate aristocrat" upon whom Hitler bestowed both Henriette and the Hitler Youth position. Through this relationship, Schirach became part of Hitler's inner circle. The young couple were welcome guests at Hitler's "Berghof". Henriette von Schirach gave birth to four children: Angelika Benedikta von Schirach (born 1933), lawyer Klaus von Schirach (born 1935), businessman Robert von Schirach (born 1938) and sinologist Richard von Schirach (born 1942). Robert had a son, lawyer and best-selling German crime writer Ferdinand von Schirach. Richard had children Ariadne von Schirach, philosopher and critic, and Benedict Wells, a novelist.

Schirach was a published author, contributing to literature journals, and an influential patron of the arts.

Nazi Party career

Reich youth leader
Schirach joined a Wehrjugendgruppe (paramilitary youth group) at the age of seventeen and became a member of the Nazi Party (NSDAP) on 9 May 1925 (membership number 17,251). On 20 July 1928, he joined the Reichsleitung (National Leadership) at the Munich Party headquarters as the leader of the National Socialist German Students' League (Nationalsozialistischer Deutscher Studentenbund; NSDStB) which he would head for the next two years. In 1929, he was selected as a Reichsredner (national speaker) and was active in Party propaganda activities. On 30 October 1931, he was named as Reichsjugendführer (National Youth Leader) of the Nazi Party. On 18 December 1931, Schirach joined the Sturmabteilung (SA) with the rank of SA-Gruppenführer. On 16 June 1932, he was made Reichsführer of the Party's Hitler Youth organization. He became a member of the Reichstag as a representative of the Party electoral list at the 31 July 1932 election. He would continue to serve in that body until the end of the Nazi regime, from November 1933 as a deputy from electoral constituency 7, Breslau, and from March 1936 as a deputy from electoral constituency 6, Pomerania.

After the Nazi seizure of power, Schirach was made Reichsleiter for Youth Education on 2 June 1933. Reichsleiter was the second highest political rank in the Nazi Party. He was named Jugendführer (Youth Leader) of the German Reich on 17 June 1933 with responsibility for all youth organizations in the nation. Also on that date, he was made a State Secretary in the Reich Interior Ministry, and he became a member of the Academy for German Law upon its formation in October 1933. On 1 December 1936, he was given the position of State Secretary to the Reich Government. Schirach was promoted to SA-Obergruppenführer on 9 November 1937.

Schirach appeared frequently at rallies, such as the Nuremberg rally of 1934, when he appeared with Hitler in rousing the Hitlerjugend audience. The event was filmed for Triumph of the Will, the propaganda film made by Leni Riefenstahl for the Nazi Party. Schirach set the militaristic tone of the youth organisation, which participated in military-style exercises, as well as practising use of military equipment, such as rifles. In July 1940, when a new play by Hans Baumann was staged there, Schirach insisted that 2,000 local Hitler Youth members be part of that performance.

In November 1939, he was called up for military service in the army. After training, he served with the 4th (Machine Gun) Company of the Großdeutschland infantry regiment during the French Campaign as a dispatch runner in the rank of Gefreiter. He was promoted to Leutnant, served as a platoon leader and was decorated for bravery with the Iron Cross 2nd class, before being recalled to Germany.

Gauleiter and Reichsstatthalter of Vienna
On 8 August 1940, Schirach succeeded Josef Bürckel as Gauleiter and Reichsstatthalter of the Reichsgau Vienna, powerful posts in which he remained until the end of the war.  He also succeeded Bürckel as Reich Defense Commissioner of Wehrkreis (Military District) XVII, which, in addition to his own Reichsgau, included Reichsgau Upper Danube, Reichsgau Lower Danube and part of Reichsgau Sudetenland. At that time he was replaced as Reichsjugendführer by Artur Axmann, though he retained his position as Reichsleiter for Youth Education. Beginning in October 1940, Schirach was assigned to organise the evacuation of 2.5 million children from cities threatened by Allied bombing. On 16 November 1942, the jurisdiction of the Reich Defense Commissioners was changed from the Wehrkreis to the Gau level, and he retained control of civil defense measures over only Reichsgau Vienna.

Schirach was an anti-Semite, responsible for sending most of the Jews from Vienna to Nazi concentration camps. During his tenure, 65,000 Jews were deported. In a speech on 15 September 1942, he said that their deportation was a "contribution to European culture". In 1942, the German composer Richard Strauss  moved with his son Franz and his Jewish daughter-in-law Alice and their children to Vienna so they could be afforded the protection of Schirach. However, 25 of her relatives were murdered in Nazi concentration camps.
In 1944, Alice and Franz were abducted by the Viennese Gestapo and imprisoned for two nights. Strauss's personal appeal to Schirach saved them, allowing him to take them back to his estate at Garmisch-Partenkirchen, where they remained under house arrest until the end of the war. Later during the war, Schirach pleaded for a moderate treatment of the eastern European peoples and criticised the conditions in which Jews were being deported.

Hitler wanted to deprive Vienna of its cultural pre-eminence, yet Schirach expanded cultural programmes including displays of Impressionist and Modernist art. As a result, he fell into disfavour with Hitler in 1943, but Hitler refused to accept his resignation. On 25 September 1944, he became the commander of the Volkssturm units in his Gau.

Schirach was notoriously anxious about air raids. He had the cellars of the Hofburg Palace in the Vienna city centre refurbished and adapted as a bomb shelter, and the lower level of the extensive subterranean Vienna air defence coordination centre in the forests to the west of Vienna held personal facilities for him. The Viennese promptly dubbed this command and control centre the "Schirach-Bunker". 

Vienna came under attack by the Red Army on 2 April 1945, and it was approaching the city centre by 9 April. On that day, Schirach broadcast a final call for citizens to fight "to the last man" and then departed his headquarters. He fled westward with the 6th Panzer Army towards the Tyrol where, on May 2, he discarded his uniform and went underground in the town of Schwaz. On 5 June, he finally surrendered to the American town commandant and was arrested by the 103rd  Counterintelligence Corps.

Trial and conviction

Schirach was one of the major war criminals put on trial at Nuremberg by the International Military Tribunal. At the trial, Schirach was one of only a few defendants to denounce Hitler (including Albert Speer and Hans Frank).

Schirach admitted his culpability for his education of the Hitler Youth:I should like to say the following in connection with Hoess' case. I have educated this generation in faith and loyalty to Hitler. The Youth Organization which I built up bore his name. I believed that I was serving a leader who would make our people and the youth of our country great and happy and free. Millions of young people believed this, together with me, and saw their ultimate ideal in National Socialism. Many died for it. Before God, before the German nation, and before my German people I alone bear the guilt of having trained our young people for a man whom I for many long years had considered unimpeachable, both as a leader and as the head of the State, of creating for him a generation who saw him as I did. The guilt is mine in that I educated the youth of Germany for a man who murdered by the millions. I believed in this man, that is all I can say for my excuse and for the characterization of my attitude. This is my own-my own personal guilt. I was responsible for the youth of the country. I was placed in authority over the young people, and the guilt is mine alone. The younger generation is guiltless. It grew up in an anti-Semitic state, ruled by anti-Semitic laws. Our youth was bound by these laws and saw nothing criminal in racial politics. But if anti-Semitism and racial laws could lead to an Auschwitz, then Auschwitz must mark the end of racial politics and the death of anti-Semitism. Hitler is dead. I never betrayed him; I never tried to overthrow him; I remained true to my oath as an officer, a youth leader, and an official. I was no blind collaborator of his; neither was I an opportunist. I was a convinced National Socialist from my earliest days-as such, I was also an anti-Semite. Hitler's racial policy was a crime which led to disaster for 5,000,000 Jews and for all the Germans. The younger generation bears no guilt. But he who, after Auschwitz, still clings to racial politics has rendered himself guilty.He claimed that members of the Hitler Youth were innocent of any of the German war crimes:

Schirach along with Speer and Fritzsche were eventually communed by Lutheran Pastor Henry F. Gerecke and were administered the Eucharist.

Schirach claimed he had not known about the extermination camps; however, the trial detailed his involvement in deportations of Jews and his speeches defending his actions.  He was originally indicted for crimes against peace for his role in building up the Hitler Youth, but was acquitted on that charge.  He was found guilty on 1 October 1946 of crimes against humanity for his role in the deportation of the Viennese Jews to certain death in German concentration camps located in German-occupied Poland. He was sentenced to 20 years in Spandau Prison, Berlin.

On 20 July 1949, his wife Henriette von Schirach (1913–1992) divorced him while he was in prison.

Schirach was released from prison on 30 September 1966, after serving his full sentence, and retired quietly to Southern Germany. In an interview shortly after his release, he expressed regret over having not done enough to prevent atrocities from being committed. He went to Munich to live with his son Robert's family. Later, in 1968, Schirach relocated with them to an estate in Trossingen. He published his memoirs, Ich glaubte an Hitler ("I believed in Hitler") in 1967 and was interviewed by British journalist David Frost. In the interview, he reflects on his imprisonment, meeting with Hitler, and the deportation of the Jews. He claimed to have no knowledge of the extermination, but admitted his guilt in regard to discriminatory education laws. While in prison, Schirach lost eyesight in the left eye through a detached retina at the hands of Russian prison guards. He also suffered from a pulmonary embolism and was diagnosed with thrombosis. On 8 August 1974, while staying at an inn in Kröv, Schirach died of coronary thrombosis. He was 67.

See also
 Glossary of Nazi Germany
 List of Nazi Party leaders and officials
The Holocaust in Austria

References

Notes

Further reading
 Fest, Joachim C. and Bullock, Michael (trans.) "Baldur von Schirach and the 'Mission of the Younger Generation'" in The Face of the Third Reich New York: Penguin, 1979 (orig. published in German in 1963), pp. 332–354.  .
 Oliver Rathkolb and John Heath (trans.) "Baldur von Schirach: Nazi Leader and Head of the Hitler Youth", 2022.

External links

 Timeline of Schirach's life 
 
 Short biography of Baldur von Schirach
 Revolution der Erziehung (Revolution of Education) by Baldur von Schirach
 Die Hitler-Jugend – Idee und Gestalt (The Hitler Youth – Idea and Character) by Baldur von Schirach
 Die Fahne der Verfolgten (The Flag of the Persecuted), collection of poetry
 Goethe an uns (Goethe to Us) by Baldur von Schirach
 Das Lied der Getreuen (The Lay of the Faithful); more poetry
 United States Holocaust Memorial Museum – Baldur von Schirach
 Biography: Baldur von Schirach
 Interview with David Frost
 
 

1907 births
1974 deaths
Converts to Protestantism
Gauleiters
German Army officers of World War II
German Christians
People convicted by the International Military Tribunal in Nuremberg
German people convicted of crimes against humanity
German people of American descent
German prisoners and detainees
German untitled nobility
Hitler Youth members
Holocaust perpetrators in Austria
Members of the Academy for German Law
Members of the Reichstag of the Weimar Republic
Members of the Reichstag of Nazi Germany
Middleton family
Nazi Party officials
Nazi Party politicians
Nazi propagandists
Nobility in the Nazi Party
Politicians from Berlin
Reichsleiters
Recipients of the Iron Cross (1939), 2nd class
Baldur
Volkssturm personnel